Pyrrhic defeat theory  is the idea that those with the power to change a system, benefit from the way it currently works.

Origin
In criminology, pyrrhic defeat theory is a way of looking at criminal justice policy. It suggests that the criminal justice system's intentions are the very opposite of common expectations; it functions the way it does in order to create a specific image of crime: one in which it is actually a threat from the poor. However, to justify the truth of the idea there must be some substance to back it up. The system needs to fight crime, to some extent at least, but to an amount only to control it and ensure it stays in a prominent position in the public eye, not enough to eliminate it.
 
This concept amalgamates ideas from Emile Durkheim, Karl Marx, Kai Erikson and Richard Quinney, drawn together by Jeffrey Reiman.
Reiman's ideas differ from those of Marx's slightly. Whereas Marx suggests that the criminal justice system serves the rich by conspicuously repressing the poor, Reiman suggests that it does so instead by its failure to reduce crime.
Durkheim suggests that crime is functional for society, and part of the very tapestry that holds it together. He suggests that an act is perceived criminal because it affects a peoples opinions:

See also
 Pyrrhic victory
 Cadmean victory
 Parkinson's law

References

Criminology